Kim Kyeong-ae (born November 12, 1989 in Daegu) is a South Korean sport shooter. She is also a member of the shooting team for East Hall Daegu South Ward, and is coached and trained by Lim Jang-su.

Kim represented South Korea at the 2012 Summer Olympics in London, where she competed in the women's 25 m pistol, along with her teammate Kim Jang-mi, who eventually won a gold medal in the final. Kim shot 286 targets in the precision stage, and 296 in the rapid-fire, for a total score of 582 points and a bonus of 19 inner tens, finishing in eleventh place.

References

External links
NBC Olympics Profile

1989 births
Living people
South Korean female sport shooters
Olympic shooters of South Korea
Shooters at the 2012 Summer Olympics
Sportspeople from Daegu
20th-century South Korean women
21st-century South Korean women